Valley of Shadows is a one-act ballet created by Kenneth MacMillan in 1983 for the Royal Ballet. The music is by Pyotr Ilyich Tchaikovsky (extracts from Hamlet and Souvenir de Florence) and Bohuslav Martinů (Double Concerto, 1938). The story is loosely based on the novel The Garden of the Finzi-Continis by Giorgio Bassani. The designer was Yolanda Sonnabend, who had first collaborated with him on 1963's Symphony.

Original cast
The first performance was on 3 March 1983, at the Royal Opera House, Covent Garden.

 Alessandra Ferri
 Sandra Conley
 Julie Wood
 Derek Deane
 Guy Niblett
 David Wall
 Ashley Page

See also
 List of ballets by title

Notes

Ballets by Kenneth MacMillan
Ballets to the music of Pyotr Ilyich Tchaikovsky
1983 ballet premieres
Ballets designed by Yolanda Sonnabend